Beatrice Kahai Adagala is a Kenyan politician who currently serves in the Kenya National Assembly as a county woman representative for Vihiga.

She was elected to parliament as the county woman representative for Vihiga in 2017, representing the Amani National Congress.

In 2020 she was one of 10 members of parliament who called for an investigation into the wealth of Deputy President William Ruto She was re-elected in the 2022 Kenyan general election.

References

See also 

 12th Parliament of Kenya
 13th Parliament of Kenya

21st-century Kenyan politicians
Year of birth missing (living people)
Living people
Kenyan women representatives
People from Vihiga County
21st-century Kenyan women politicians
Members of the 12th Parliament of Kenya
Members of the 13th Parliament of Kenya
Place of birth missing (living people)